Giovanni Cristoforo (or Giancristoforo) Romano (1456–1512) was an Italian Renaissance sculptor and medallist.

Born in Rome to Isaia da Pisa, he was probably a pupil of Andrea Bregno. His first known works are in the Ducal Palace of Urbino, dating from before 1482. Later he worked as medallist for the courts of Ferrara and Mantua, where he was a favourite of duchess Isabella d'Este.

In 1491 he moved to Milan called by Isabella's brother-in-law Ludovico Sforza, who commissioned him the tomb of Gian Galeazzo Visconti at the Certosa di Pavia, which he executed in collaboration with Benedetto Briosco. After the fall of the Sforza (1499) he returned to work for Isabella d'Este, for which he executed some fine medals and the precious marble portal of her study in the Ducal Palace of Mantua.

Later, he sojourned in Rome (called by Pope Julius II), Naples, Cremona, and again Milan and Urbino.

The tripartite marble altar-piece in the Costa Chapel in Santa Maria del Popolo was probably created by him for Cardinal Jorge da Costa around 1505.

He died in 1512.

References 
 Giorgio Vasari, Le vite
 A. Venturi, Studi su G.C.R. scultore in Atti del I congresso nazionale di studi romani, Roma 1929
 R. Bossaglia, La scultura, in La Certosa di Pavia, a cura di M. G. Albertini Ottolenghi, R. Bossaglia, F. R. Pesenti, Milano 1968
 A. Nova, "Dall'arca alle esequie. Aspetti della scultura a Cremona nel XVI secolo", in I Campi e la cultura artistica cremonese del cinquecento, Milano 1985

Italian Renaissance sculptors
1456 births
1512 deaths
Italian medallists
Artists from Rome
15th-century Italian sculptors
Italian male sculptors
16th-century Italian sculptors